The European Environmental Bureau (EEB) is a network of around 170 environmental citizens' organisations based in more than 35 countries. The EEB is a democratic federation, representing local, national, European and international groups in European Union Member States, plus some accession and neighbouring countries. It plays a prominent role in defending and promoting environmental interests and legislation at the different EU institutions.

History 
Before the first Environmental Action Plan was adopted by the European Community, environmental NGOs from Europe met in the United Kingdom, together with the European Commission, the UNECE, the UNEP and the IUCN. During the meeting, the creation of a federation of non-governmental organizations within the European Community was proposed, which later become an information clearinghouse for the EC countries.

The EEB office was set up in Brussels in 1974 to provide a focal point for its members to monitor and respond to the EU's emerging environmental policy.

In 1998, the EEB led the issue group on public participation of the pan-European coalition on environmental citizens' organizations, later named as European ECO Forum, which was closely involved in the negotiating phase of the UNECE Aarhus Convention.

By 2013, it was considered as one of the seven core environmental organizations in Europe, together with Friends of the Earth Europe (FFoE), Greenpeace International, the World Wide Fund for Nature (WWF), the Climate Network Europe (CAN-E), the European Federation for Transport and Environment (T&E), and BirdLife International.

EU political institutions had a large role in the formation and maintenance of Brussel-based umbrella- and federation type groups representing EU civil society, through direct funding relationships (estimated around 80 per cent in 2005) from the Union budget, and by virtue of an early preference of the Commission for engaging only with EU level groups.

Mission 
The EEB's mission is to be "the largest and most inclusive European network of environmental citizens’ groups – and the only one that works on such a broad range of issues", while advocating "for progressive policies to create a better environment in the European Union and beyond."

Activities 

The EEB has an information service, runs working groups with its members, produces position papers on topics that are, or EEB feels should be, on the EU agenda, and represents its members in discussions with the European Commission, the European Parliament and the Council of the EU. It closely coordinates EU-oriented activities with members at national level, and also closely follows the EU enlargement process and some pan-European issues such as follow-up to the Aarhus Convention (the UNECE 'Convention on Access to Information, Public Participation in Decision-making and Access to Justice in Environmental Matters').

The organisation has consultative status at, and relations with: the Council of Europe, the European Commission, the European Parliament, the Economic and Social Committee of the European Union, the OECD (Organisation for Economic Co-operation and Development), and the United Nation Commission on Sustainable Development (CSD).

Membership network

Environmental organisations in candidate countries (those applying to join the EU) and, increasingly, in the Western Balkans, regard the EEB as their main partner with a European focus. The EEB's experience, relationships and position are of great value to these states in determining their own role in processes related to EU enlargement and the environment. Owing to the EEB's proactive involvement, its members from New Member States and those aspiring to join the EU are already numerous and are increasing.

Member organisations

Campaigns
In November 2004, working with the Ban Mercury Working Group, EEB launched the Zero Mercury campaign, whose ultimate goal is to achieve zero emissions, demand and supply of mercury, from all sources we can control, to reduce global environmental mercury levels to a minimum. An international Zero Mercury Working Group was created to follow up developments at European and global level.

Since the beginning of 2011, EEB has been coordinating the Coolproducts campaign aiming at unleashing the energy savings potential of energy-related products.

References

External links
 Official website
Zero Mercury campaign
Green 10
Coolproducts for a cool planet
Spring alliance

Nature conservation organisations based in Europe
Environmental organisations based in Belgium
Environmental law in the European Union